Monte Vista, also known as Cedar Grove Farm and Heater House, is a historic home located near Middletown, Frederick County, Virginia. It was built in 1883, and is a large three-story, five bay, brick dwelling with Eastlake and Queen Anne design elements.  The front facade features a two-story portico with four full-height Tuscan columns, added about 1942.  Also on the property are the contributing large bank barn with cupola and weathervane, a scale house dating at least to 1907, a frame summer kitchen, a two level stone ice house, a smokehouse, and a brick bake oven.  It was owned by Solomon and Caroline Wunder Heater, who lost two sons fighting for the Confederacy, even though she was a staunch Union sympathizer.

It was listed on the National Register of Historic Places in 1987.

References

External links

Houses on the National Register of Historic Places in Virginia
Queen Anne architecture in Virginia
Houses completed in 1883
Houses in Frederick County, Virginia
National Register of Historic Places in Frederick County, Virginia